James Kelly Robinson II (July 29, 1950, Washington, D.C. – January 6, 2018, New York) was an American recording engineer, record producer and musician. He was best known for his engineering techniques with both analogue and digital audio recordings with prominent popular pop and rock records in American music from the late 1960s to the present. In addition to his recording expertise, Robinson was also an accomplished musician in his own right and had been awarded gold records as both a saxophonist and bass guitarist.

Early life

Jimmy Robinson was born July 29, 1950, in Washington D.C. to James K. Robinson I and Louise H. Robinson and spent his early childhood growing up in College Park, Maryland. At an early age Robinson took a strong interest in music and electronics while attending schools in the Washington metropolitan area and began playing saxophone at age of 12 with various bands before joining in the band "The Nowhere Men" at the age of 18 in 1968.

Engineering and producing

The Record Plant NYC
In 1969, The Nowhere Men were playing a show at The Cellar Door in DC's Georgetown district when Robinson met former Electric Flag drummer Buddy Miles. Buddy took a liking to Robinson's sax playing and invited him up to New York City to work a few gigs and meet Gary Kellgren, and subsequently Jimi Hendrix, at the Record Plant recording studios in New York City.

Gary Kellgren immediately was impressed with Robinson's technical ability and asked him to begin working as an assistant engineer at the Record Plant NYC. At his first session there in 1969, he worked with engineer Jack Adams and R&B singer Patti LaBelle.

During his tenure working at the Record Plant, Robinson developed a close working relationship with Hendrix whom he would drive home and hang out with after sessions. Hendrix preferred to work at night and since Gary Kellgren and fellow engineer Eddie Kramer preferred to record during the day, Robinson soon became one of Hendrix's regular recording engineers for late night sessions.

Band of Gypsys
Upon hearing that Capitol Records was looking for Hendrix to fulfill a contract he had signed with Ed Chaplin of PPX Enterprises before he had put together the Jimi Hendrix Experience, Hendrix decided to form a band with Buddy Miles and long-time friend and bass player Billy Cox. The name "Band of Gypsys" was already mentioned as an alternative name for his band by Hendrix in his speeches during the Woodstock concert.

Capitol Records sent out Wally Heider to record the live debut of the Band of Gypsys and Gary Kellgren sent Robinson as the Record Plant's preferred engineer. The first live show was to be performed at the Fillmore East on New Year's Eve 1969 with the Voices of East Harlem as the opening act.

The Band of Gypsys' performances were recorded two nights in a row with two shows each night. After the shows, the recordings were sent over to Juggy Sound Studios (owned by producer Juggy Murray) where the album was to be mixed by Eddie Kramer. For a few days the tapes went missing, but were soon found, mixed by Kramer, and then delivered to Capitol Records.

The Band of Gypsys Live at the Fillmore East went up the charts quickly to #4 in the US and #5 in the U.K. and was RIAA certified gold that same year. This was a first for a live recording. Initially, it was unclear if it was going to be a commercial success. However, shortly after its release it was hailed by critics as the standard for which all artists should strive in live recordings. The recording was Jimmy Robinson's first gold record for recording. Robinson's recording of "Machine Gun" (Capitol Records STAO-472 -US) on Band of Gypsys is considered by most Hendrix aficionados to be the best live solo recording of Hendrix.

Loose Ends, the fourth and last studio album released by Hendrix which Robinson engineered and overdubbed, was released by manager Michael Jeffery. Unfortunately, Warner Bros. Records decided not to release the album in the US & Canada because of content. It was released in the UK, France and Japan.

Electric Lady Studios

Under the advice of Eddie Kramer and manager Michael Jefferies, Hendrix decided to construct his own recording studio, Electric Lady. After construction was completed, Kramer and Andy Edlen invited Robinson to work there in the summer of 1970. During his tenure working at Electric Lady, Robinson began working on a few tracks for Stevie Wonder's Talking Book and Innervisions. Robinson also worked with several prominent artists of the time including Roberta Flack, Led Zeppelin (on Houses of the Holy), Blood Sweat and Tears, and Miles Davis' Live Evil. In August 1972, jazz vibraphonist Michael Manieri asked Robinson to be his assistant and join GNU Music. Robinson worked for Manieri until the end of the year.

Larabee Sound Los Angeles
In January 1973 Bob Margoulieff and Malcolm Cecil invited Jimmy out to Los Angeles to work on a few projects, and Robinson decided it was time to leave NYC.

Upon arriving in Los Angeles, Robinson quickly found himself as the lead candidate to be Chief Engineer of Larrabee Sound on Bob Margoulieff and Malcolm Cecil's recommendation. In February 1973 Robinson was invited to join Larabee Sound as Chief Engineer under the supervision of Jackie Mills. The first slate of recording projects included Cher, Al Wilson, Robbie Krieger, John Densmore from The Doors, Chris DeMarco, and Rachel Perry.

As Jimmy was working at Larabee his fondness for technology and instrument construction led him to begin working with Paul Beaver as part of the synthesizer team Beaver and Krouse on a suggestion from Walter Sear; he began developing a polyphonic synthesizer with Paul Beaver that unfortunately never came to fruition due to Beaver's untimely death in 1974.

Robinson married Maggie Welch, sister of Bob Welch, the guitarist and vocalist for Fleetwood Mac; the couple invited Bob to move into their home in Laurel Canyon. Bob and Jimmy became good friends, and shortly after Bob moved in they had a discussion about Welch's desire to leave Fleetwood Mac.

Robinson suggested bringing in former Jethro Tull bassist Glen Cornick and ex Nazz drummer Thom Mooney for a new project and brought the band to John Carter at Capitol Records. The new group was to be called Paris, and the idea was embraced by Al Courey, then head of Capitol's A&R department.

The Record Plant, L.A.

Every Sunday night at 6 pm, Gary Kellgren would throw a special A-List only party bearing the name "The Jim Keltner Fan Club Hour" after world-famous drummer Jim Keltner, who was well known in musician's circles at the time. Austin Godsey, who lived with Jack Adams across from Frank Zappa's house in Laurel Canyon, invited Robinson to the latest "The Jim Keltner Fan Club Hour" party at The Record Plant in Los Angeles.

Upon arrival at the Record Plant, Robinson was asked by Kellgren to help out with recording the artists during the jam session. The artists at the studios that evening were John Lennon, Mick Jagger, Jessie Ed Davis, Danny Kortchmar, Trever Lawrence, Bobby Keys, Jim Price, Jim Keltner, Ringo Starr, Bruce Gary, Wolfgang Metz, Rocky Djubano, Mike Finnigan, Al Kooper, Harry Nilsson, Vennetta Fields, Clydie King, and Claudia Lennear, all appearing on a track to be entitled "Too Many Cooks are Bound to Spoil the Soup". The engineers for the session were Gary Kellgren, Lee Kiefer, Austin Godsy, and Robinson. The current location of the original 16 track master is unknown to this day; however, bootleg 2 tracks have surfaced from time to time on the internet.

While working on Paris, Robinson received a phone call from Ben Edmonds from Capitol Records A&R department and asked him to work with Jimmy Page on a new group signed to Swan Song Records. The group was to be called "Detective" and Robinson was to serve as producer and engineer for the first album. This album turned out so well that many Led Zeppelin fans thought that Jimmy Page had produced it under the pseudonym "Jimmy Robinson".

After Detective, Robinson began two albums with Sammy Hagar. The first project with Hagar was 9 on a Ten Scale and then subsequently Red. Shortly after working with Hagar, Lou Bramey of Spread Eagle Productions asked Jimmy Robinson to record and produce Y&T's Struck Down album for London Records. The album Struck Down is best remembered for Dave Meniketti's heavy guitar leads that was preceded the metal scene by a decade.

During his tenure with the Record Plant in Los Angeles, Jimmy developed an even closer friendship with Gary Kellgren and the two of them took over Sly Stone's custom project studio in Sausalito, CA called "The Pit" that featured eccentric amenities such as a recessed recording area with shag carpeting and secret passages; there, they worked closely with Sly Stone, Paris, Sammy Hagar, Bill Wyman of the Rolling Stones, Van Morrison, and Tower of Power.

Gary Kellgren

The sudden death of his close friend Gary Kellgren in 1977 devastated Robinson. Although he continued to work at The Record Plant Los Angeles, the infamous studio didn't feel the same and so with great sadness Robinson left to pursue other endeavors.

After completing that project, Robinson took a job working A&R for Capitol Records where he helped with the development of several punk rock bands, most notably "The Dogs". After getting word that his mother's health was not good, Robinson moved back to NYC to be close to her and work as a freelance engineer.

Chun King , Sony Music, MTV, NYC

As an independent engineer Jimmy Robinson found himself highly sought after as a consultant and began working for numerous companies of those included; MTV headquarters in NYC, Chun King Studios, and Sony Music for Tommy Mattola and Dave Smith.

2003 to present
Jimmy Robinson worked as a freelance engineer right up until his death and produced records with his own small company Ear Candy Audio Productions based in NYC. In addition to his production work he was also an active member of The International Communications Industries Association, A.R.R.L. (Ham Radio), a voting member of National Academy of Recording Arts and Sciences (N.A.R.A.S./Grammys), and voting member of the Audio Engineering Society (A.E.S.).

Jimmy Robinson died in New York on January 6, 2018, at the age of 67.

Artists and associated acts and credits

 Carmine Appice
 Al Kooper
 Alice in Chains
 Jimmy Bain
 David Bowie
 Jason Becker
 Pat Benatar
 Tim Bogart
 Band of Gypsys
 Led Zeppelin
 Cher
 Miles Davis
 Vic Damone
 Chris DeMarco
 The Dogs
 Even Steven Levee
 Marty Friedman
 Tom Petty & The Heartbreakers
 Sly & The Family Stone
 Jinx Dawson (Coven)
 Martha Davis (The Motels)
 Rick Derringer
 Detective
 Ainsley Dunbar (Journey & The Starship)
 John Entwistle (The Who)
 Buzzy Feiten
 Fleetwood Mac
 Paris
 Sammy Hagar
 Ebn-Ozn
 Jack Killed Jill
 Jimi Hendrix
 Billy Joel
 Mick Jagger
 James Earl Jones
 BB King
 Robbie Krieger
 Carole King
 Moogy Klingman
 John Lennon
 Claudine Longet
 Love
 Loudness
 Lynyrd Skynyrd
 Tony MacAlpine
 Harvey Mandel
 Dave Mason
 Mahavishnu Orchestra
 Paul McCartney
 Buddy Miles
 Keith Moon
 Kiss
 Mandrill
 Michael Monarch
 The Mothers of Invention
 Harry Nilsson
 Billy Preston
 Gordon Raphael
 Todd Rungren
 Saxon
 Brian Setzer (Stray Cats)
 Ben Schultz
 Ravi Shankar
 Patty Smyth & Scandal
 Paul Shaffer
 Ringo Starr
 Rod Stewart
 Steven Stills
 Barbra Streisand
 Tommy Tedesco
 Tim Davis
 Klaus Voormann
 Jimmy Webb
 Al Wilson
 Stevie Wonder
 Ron Wood
 Bill Wyman
 Velvet Underground
 Y&T
 Frank Zappa

References

External links

 Knack.com
 Donniemack.com
 Books.google.com
 Fleetwoodmac.net
 Chrisdemarco.com
 Books.google.com
 Timdulaine.com
 Bobwelch.com
 Garykellgren.com
 Music.barnesandnoble.com
 Acc.umu.se
 Pqasb.pqarchiver.com

Record producers from Washington, D.C.
1950 births
2018 deaths